Shikarpur Assembly constituency was an assembly constituency in Paschim Champaran district in the Indian state of Bihar. It was reserved for scheduled castes.

Overview
It was part of Bagaha Lok Sabha constituency.

As a consequence of the orders of the Delimitation Commission of India, Shikarpur Assembly constituency ceased to exist in 2010.

Election results
In the October 2005 state assembly elections Bhagirathi Devi of BJP won the Shikarpur (SC) assembly seat defeating her nearest rival Subodh Kumar of NCP. Contests in most years were multi cornered but only winners and runners are being mentioned. In February 2005, Subodh Kumar of NCP defeated Bhagirathi Devi of BJP.

In 2000, Bhagirathi Devi of BJP defeated Subodh Kumar of NCP. Bhola Ram Toofani of JD defeated Subodh Kumar representing BJP in 1995 and Narsingh Baitha of Congress in 1990. Narsingh Baitha of Congress defeated Bhola Ram Toofani of Janata Party in 1985. Sitaram Prasad of Congress defeated Narsingh Baitha of Congress (U) in 1980 and Dinanath Chandra of Janata Party in 1977.

References

Former assembly constituencies of Bihar
Politics of West Champaran district